Nazarabad (also Romanized as Naz̧arābād) is a village in Jolgah Rural District, in the Central District of Jahrom County, Fars Province, Iran. At the 2006 census, its population was 153, in 33 families.

References 

Populated places in Jahrom County